The Welsh Football League Division Three, (last known as the Nathanielcars.co.uk Welsh League Division Three, for sponsorship reasons) was a football league.

History
Until the 1964–65 season the Welsh Football League operated three divisions, Division One, and two regional Division Two leagues, East and West within the Welsh football league system in South Wales. From the 1964–65 season this changed with Division One becoming the Premier Division and Division Two renamed as Division One. Following these changes, a Tier 3, Division Two was created. operated under the Division Two titleFrom 1983-84 season, the Premier Division changed its name to the National Division and the First Division adopted the Premier Division'' With these changes the third tier Division Two was renamed 'Division One'

With the creation of the League of Wales for the 1992–93 season, the Welsh Football League moved to levels two, three and four of the Welsh football pyramid, and adopted the titles of Division One, Division Two and Division Three respectively.

After the creation of the Cymru South, for the 2019–20 season, the league was rebranded as the Welsh Football League Division Two and Division Three was defunct.

Promotion and relegation
If the team which finished top of the Division had good enough ground facilities, it was promoted to the Welsh Football League Division Two and was replaced by the team finishing bottom of Division Two. The team finishing in bottom position of the division was relegated to one of the local leagues.

Champions
as Division Two (Tier 3 of the Welsh Football League)

 1964-65: Chepstow Town
 1965-66: Caerleon
 1966-67: Swansea University
 1967-68: Cwmbrân Town 
 1968-69: Ynysybwl Athletic
 1969-70: Croesyceiliog
 1970-71: Cardiff University
 1971-72: Sully
 1972-73: Pontllanfraith
 1973-74: Caerau Athletic
 1974-75: Blaenavon Blues
 1975-76: Abergavenny Thursdays
 1976-77: Milford United
 1977-78: Aberaman Athletic
 1978-79: Newport YMCA
 1979-80: Lake United
 1980-81: Trelewis
 1981-82: Ferndale Athletic
 1982-83: Tondu Robins

as Division One (Tier 3 of the Welsh Football League)

 1983-84: Pontlottyn Blast Furnace
 1984-85: Taff's Well
 1985-86: South Wales Police
 1986-87: BP (Llandarcy)
 1987-88: Merthyr Tydfil
 1988-89: Garw Athletic
 1989-90: Caldicot Town

as Division Two (Tier 3 of the Welsh Football League)

 1990-91: Cardiff Civil Service
 1991-92: AFC Porth

as Division Three (Tier 4 of the Welsh Football Pyramid)

 1992-93: Treowen Stars
 1993–94: Penrhiwceiber Rangers
 1994–95: Pontardawe Town
 1995–96: Cardiff Institute
 1996–97: Gwynfi United
 1997–98: Milford United
 1998–99: Caerleon
 1999–2000 Garw Athletic
 2000–01: Bettws
 2001–02: Newport YMCA
 2002–03: Pontyclun
 2003–04: Bryntirion Athletic
 2004–05: Troedyrhiw
 2005–06: West End
 2006–07: Cwmbran Celtic
 2007–08: Pentwyn Dynamo
 2008–09: AFC Llwydcoed
 2009–10: Aberbargoed Buds
 2010–11: Monmouth Town
 2011–12: Undy Athletic
 2012–13: Cardiff Metropolitan University
 2013–14: Barry Town United
 2014–15: Llanelli Town
 2015–16: Pontypridd Town 
 2016–17: Llantwit Major
 2017–18: Swansea University
 2018–19: Penydarren BGC

See also
Football in Wales
Welsh football league system
Welsh Cup
Welsh League Cup
FAW Premier Cup
List of football clubs in Wales
List of stadiums in Wales by capacity

References

3
Football leagues in Wales
Wales
1964 establishments in Wales
2019 disestablishments in Wales
Defunct football competitions in Wales
Sports leagues established in 1964
Sports leagues disestablished in 2019